Graham Cooper (24 April 1938 – 11 December 2019) was an Australian rules footballer who played for Hawthorn in the Victorian Football League (VFL) during the early 1960s.

Usually seen in the back pocket, Cooper was a member of Hawthorn's inaugural premiership side in 1961 VFL Grand Final. He also played in the losing side in the 1963 VFL Grand Final.
His last game for Hawthorn was against the Ron Barrassi led  in the open round of 1965.

He left Hawthorn to take up a coaching position with Jerilderie in New South Wales. By 1969 he was back in Melbourne as he was coach of Oakleigh in the VFA from 1969 to 1970.

He was an older brother of St Kilda player, Ian Cooper.

References

External links 
 

1938 births
2019 deaths
Australian rules footballers from Victoria (Australia)
Hawthorn Football Club players
Hawthorn Football Club Premiership players
One-time VFL/AFL Premiership players